Rudnei da Rosa  (born 7 October 1984), simply known as Rudnei, is a Brazilian footballer who plays for Inter de Lages as defensive midfielder.

Career
Rudnei has played in the Campeonato Brasileiro for Grêmio and Náutico.

References

External links

Rudnei da Rosa at playmakerstats.com (English version of ogol.com.br)

1984 births
Sportspeople from Florianópolis
Living people
Brazilian footballers
Association football midfielders
Figueirense FC players
Clube 15 de Novembro players
Grêmio Foot-Ball Porto Alegrense players
Criciúma Esporte Clube players
Clube Náutico Capibaribe players
Avaí FC players
Ventforet Kofu players
Ceará Sporting Club players
Cruzeiro Esporte Clube players
FC Spartak Vladikavkaz players
Associação Portuguesa de Desportos players
Xinjiang Tianshan Leopard F.C. players
Hercílio Luz Futebol Clube players
Esporte Clube Internacional de Lages players
Campeonato Brasileiro Série A players
Campeonato Brasileiro Série B players
Campeonato Brasileiro Série D players
Campeonato Catarinense players
J1 League players
Russian Premier League players
China League One players
Brazilian expatriate footballers
Expatriate footballers in Japan
Brazilian expatriate sportspeople in Japan
Expatriate footballers in Russia
Brazilian expatriate sportspeople in Russia
Expatriate footballers in China
Brazilian expatriate sportspeople in China